Kitt Green is a suburb of Wigan. It is the location of a Heinz food processing plant.

References

External links

Areas of Wigan